Wydzierów  is a village in the administrative district of Gmina Ujazd, within Strzelce County, Opole Voivodeship, in south-western Poland. 

References

Villages in Strzelce County